Gülçiçek Hatun (Gülçiçek = "rose blossom"; originally named Μαρία, Maria) was a Greek woman from Bithynia who became the first wife of Ottoman Sultan Murad I and Valide Hatun to their son Bayezid I.

Biography
According to a tradition, Gülçiçek was the consort of Aclan Bey, one of the Princes of the Anatolian Muslim Principality of Karasids. She was captured when Orhan conquered the principality ( 1344) and placed in the Ottoman Palace. Some years later, when Orhan's son Murad had reached adulthood, an attempt was made to marry Gülçiçek, but she refused several names suggested to her, until Murad suggested himself. She married Murad I in 1359. There is a support for this story, or part of it at least, in the fact that she appointed her son Yahşi as trustee for an endowment deed she made for a Dervish Monastery, as Murad had no son of this name. 

She gave birth to two sons, Bayezid I and Yahşi Bey. In her lifetime she established a religious and charitable foundation which demonstrated her Muslim piety publicly. With its revenues she built a mosque and a tomb in Bursa where she was buried.

See also
Ottoman Empire
Ottoman dynasty
Ottoman family tree
Valide sultan
List of sultans of the Ottoman Empire
Line of succession to the Ottoman throne
Ottoman Emperors family tree (simplified)
List of consorts of the Ottoman Sultans

Further reading
 Peirce, Leslie P., The Imperial Harem: Women and Sovereignty in the Ottoman Empire, Oxford University Press, 1993,  (paperback).

References

Valide sultan
14th-century consorts of Ottoman sultans

zh:居尔奇切克可敦